Dicranopalpus ramosus is a species of harvestman. Males are up to 4 mm long, females can reach up to 6 mm. Both sexes have very long legs (especially the second pair can reach up to 5 cm), with a distinct elongated apophysis that reaches almost to the end of the tibia. This makes their pedipalps look forked. Their body is brownish with dark markings, the females being lighter colored.

The forked pedipalps and the resting posture, with the legs stretched to the sides, makes this species easy to identify, although the traditional method of collecting invertebrates does not prove adequate: of 103 individuals captured in Belgium, only one was found in a pitfall; all others were collected by hand.

Adults can be found from August to November, mostly in gardens and on outer walls, but sometimes also inside.

Distribution
Originally the species was found in Morocco. Later it spread into Europe, with first reports in Portugal (1948), where it spread to Spain (1965) and France (1969). The Netherlands were reached in 1992. Since 2004 it is known to occur in Germany. As early as 1957, it was reported in Bournemouth, southern England, from where it spread all over the island, reaching Scotland in 2000. From 2010, it has been established in most of Denmark, and from 2012 south Sweden. In 2019, an individual photographed by iNaturalist user "kiwikiu" at Cannon Beach, Oregon, suggested the species' introduction into the United States. Since then, the species has been documented several times in the area.

The very similar and closely related D. gasteinensis is found in the Alps.

References
  (1997). Kosmos-Atlas Spinnentiere Europas. Kosmos. 
 The Garden Safari: D. ramosus
 Opiliones in Belgium: D. ramosus
 's Biology Catalog: Phalangiidae
 iNaturalist.org: Fork-palped Harvestman

External links

 BioImages: D. ramosus

Harvestmen
Animals described in 1909
Arachnids of Africa
Arachnids of Europe
Taxa named by Eugène Simon